Sir Roger Palmer, 1st Baronet (1729 – 25 January 1790) was an Anglo-Irish politician.

Palmer was elected as a Member of Parliament for Jamestown in the Irish House of Commons in 1761. In 1768 he was returned for the Portarlington constituency, sitting for that seat until 1783. On 29 May 1777 he was created a baronet, of Castle Lackin in the Baronetage of Ireland.

References

1729 births
1790 deaths
18th-century Anglo-Irish people
Baronets in the Baronetage of Ireland
Irish MPs 1761–1768
Irish MPs 1769–1776
Irish MPs 1776–1783
Members of the Parliament of Ireland (pre-1801) for Queen's County constituencies
Members of the Parliament of Ireland (pre-1801) for County Leitrim constituencies